Soup for One is the soundtrack album to the movie Soup for One by American R&B band Chic et al., released by Mirage Records in 1982. The album reached number 168 on the Billboard 200 albums chart and number 42 on the R&B chart. Besides three previously released tracks, Chic's "I Want Your Love" from 1978 album C'est Chic, Sister Sledge's "Let's Go On Vacation" from 1980s Love Somebody Today and "Jump, Jump" from Debbie Harry's KooKoo, the album contains five songs specifically written and produced by Bernard Edwards and Nile Rodgers for the movie.

Chic's title track stalled at number 80 on the US Pop chart, but was a Top 20 hit on the R&B singles chart, peaking at number 14, making it their best R&B chart entry since 1980s "Rebels Are We". "Why" with vocals by Carly Simon was only moderately successful on its initial release in the US (Pop No. 74, September 1982), but the song turned out to be a surprise hit in Europe, where it reached number 10 on the singles charts in the UK. Later, the extended 12" remix—featuring additional vocals by Chic's Alfa Anderson and Luci Martin—also became something of an underground club classic in the U.S. The Soup for One album also includes Chic's one and only collaboration with soul singer Teddy Pendergrass, the ballad "Dream Girl". Pendergrass had a small role as a nightclub singer performing the song in the movie, although it was however never issued as a single. Long-standing Chic vocalist Fonzi Thornton's track "I Work for a Livin'" is taken from what was planned to be his first solo project. The album entitled "Frostbite" was recorded in 1981/82, and was written and produced by Bernard Edwards and Nile Rodgers, but remains unreleased. Chic also wrote the track "Riding", sung by Fonzi, which appeared in the film, but was not included on the soundtrack album. This track was intended for Fonzi Thornton's unreleased solo project. "Tavern on the Green" is an acoustic guitar piece and another instrumental Chic track, "Open Up" from 1980s Real People, also appeared in the film but was not included on the soundtrack album. Paradoxically, Carly Simon's "Why", the biggest hit single from the album, was not featured in the film.

A Tribe Called Quest sampled "Why" for their 1990 hit "Bonita Applebum", as did British rapper Glamma Kid in 1999, taking the song back up to number 10 on the UK Singles Chart. Chic's "Soup for One" was sampled by French dance act Modjo for their 2000 song "Lady (Hear Me Tonight)", a number 1 hit in most of Europe. The album Soup for One was released on compact disc in 2015.

Track listing
All tracks written by Bernard Edwards and Nile Rodgers unless otherwise noted.
Side A
 Chic - "Soup for One"  - 5:35
 Carly Simon - "Why"  - 4:06
 Teddy Pendergrass - "Dream Girl" - 4:10
 Fonzi Thornton - "I Work for a Livin'" - 3:31
Side B
 Chic - "I Want Your Love"  - 6:58
 Sister Sledge - "Let's Go On Vacation"  - 5:09
 Chic - "Tavern on the Green"  - 2:15
 Deborah Harry - "Jump, Jump" (Harry, Chris Stein) - 4:04

Personnel
 Bernard Edwards - lead vocals, bass guitar
 Carly Simon - lead vocals
 Teddy Pendergrass - lead vocals
 Fonzi Thornton - lead vocals
 Alfa Anderson - lead vocals
 Debbie Sledge (Sister Sledge) - lead vocals
 Joni Sledge (Sister Sledge) - vocals
 Kathy Sledge (Sister Sledge) - vocals
 Kim Sledge (Sister Sledge) - vocals
 Deborah Harry - lead vocals
 Nile Rodgers - guitar, vocals
 Tony Thompson - drums
 Luci Martin - vocals
 Michelle Cobbs - vocals
 Jocelyn Brown - vocals
 Diva Gray - vocals
 Robin Clark - vocals
 Raymond Jones - keyboards
 Andy Schwartz - keyboards
 Sammy Figueroa - percussion
 Meco Monardo - horns
 Robert Millikan - horns
 Eddie Daniels - horns
 José Rossi - tubular bells
 Chic Strings - strings

Production
 Bernard Edwards - record producer for Chic Organization Ltd.
 Nile Rodgers - producer for Chic Organization Ltd.
 Bob Clearmountain - sound engineer
 Bill Scheniman - engineer
 Scott Litt - engineer
 Jason Corsaro - assistant engineer
 Jeff Hendrickson - assistant engineer
 Josh Abbey - assistant engineer
 Dave "The Rave" Greenberg - assistant engineer
 Barry Bongiovi - assistant engineer
 Recorded and mixed at Power Station NYC
 Mastered at Atlantic Studios NYC

Single releases
All tracks written by Bernard Edwards and Nile Rodgers.

7" Chic: "Soup For One". Mirage Records (US)/WEA Records (Europe), July 1982.
 "Soup For One" (7" Edit) - 3:08 / "Burn Hard" (7" Edit)  - 3:39
 
12" Chic: "Soup For One". Mirage/WEA, July 1982.
 "Soup For One" (12" Mix)  - 7:58 / "Burn Hard" (Album Version)  - 5:12
 
7" Carly Simon: "Why". Mirage/WEA, August 1982.
 "Why" (7" Edit)  - 3:33 / "Why" (7" Instrumental)  - 3:33
 
12" Carly Simon/Chic: "Why". Mirage/WEA, August 1982.
 Carly Simon: "Why" (12" Mix)  - 8:11 / Chic: "Why" (12" Instrumental)  - 7:06

Chic (band) albums
Albums produced by Nile Rodgers
Albums produced by Bernard Edwards
1982 soundtrack albums
Warner Records soundtracks
Comedy film soundtracks